Cape Capricorn is a coastal headland on Curtis Island, Gladstone Region, Queensland, Australia.

It was named by Captain Cook when he passed on 25 May 1770, since he found it to be located on the Tropic of Capricorn (which was located at 23°28′15″ in 1770).  The modern surveyed location of its endpoint is just slightly south of the present tropic.

Heritage listings
Cape Capricorn has a number of heritage-listed sites, including:
 North eastern  tip of Curtis Island: Cape Capricorn Light

Lighthouse

A lighthouse was first established on the Cape in 1875. The current lighthouse, dating from 1964, is the third built on the site. The lighthouse, like most along the Queensland coast, is automated.

View

References

External links 
Cape Capricorn Lighthouse Escape - Curtis Island Lighthouse

Capricorn